Muddy Mountain is a peak in the Laramie Mountains approximately 12 miles SSE of Casper, Wyoming. There is a two-mile "interpretive nature trail" maintained by the Bureau of Land Management, as well as a series of trails popular with mountain bikers, horseback riders, and ATVs in the summer, and snowmobiles in the winter.

References

Mountains of Natrona County, Wyoming
Mountains of Wyoming